The men's 60 kg powerlifting event at the 2008 Summer Paralympics was contested on 11 September at the Beihang University Gymnasium in Beijing, China. Powerlifters were divided into two groups, A and B, with group B beginning their lifts at 16:30 and group A at 17:15.

As with all Paralympic powerlifting events, lifters competed in the bench press. Each athlete was allowed three attempts to bench press as much weight as possible. Athletes attempting to break a record were allowed a fourth attempt. For the attempt to be valid, the competitor must have lowered the weighted bar to his chest, held it motionless for a moment, then pressed the bar upwards until his arms were fully extended. If the competitor failed to meet these requirements or any other rule infraction was committed, the attempt was declared invalid by a team of three referees and the result struck from the record.

Results 

Key: PR=Paralympic record

References 

 

Men's 060 kg